Greg Riaka Loveridge (born 15 January 1975) is a former cricketer who played one Test match for New Zealand in 1996.

Born in Palmerston North, Loveridge represented Central Districts in New Zealand's domestic competitions, as well as playing for Manawatu in the Hawke Cup and in England for Cambridge University.

International career
Batting in the first innings of his only Test, against Zimbabwe, Loveridge fractured a knuckle and was unable to bowl. Loveridge became only the sixth batsman, after Charles Bannerman, Talat Ali, Ewen Chatfield, Andy Lloyd and Sanjay Manjrekar, to retire hurt in his debut Test.

After cricket
He is now the general manager of New Zealand property company Robert Jones Holdings.

References

External links

1975 births
Living people
Cricketers from Palmerston North
New Zealand cricketers
Cambridge University cricketers
Massey University alumni
Alumni of St Edmund's College, Cambridge
Central Districts cricketers
New Zealand Test cricketers
New Zealand businesspeople
British Universities cricketers